Courtney Carl Williams (born 31 January 1991 in Kingstown, Saint Vincent and the Grenadines) is a Vincentian runner who competed at the 2012 Summer Olympics in the 100 m event.

Personal bests

Competition record

References

External links

1991 births
People from Kingstown
Living people
Olympic athletes of Saint Vincent and the Grenadines
Saint Vincent and the Grenadines male sprinters
Athletes (track and field) at the 2012 Summer Olympics
World Athletics Championships athletes for Saint Vincent and the Grenadines
Commonwealth Games competitors for Saint Vincent and the Grenadines
Athletes (track and field) at the 2014 Commonwealth Games
Pan American Games competitors for Saint Vincent and the Grenadines
Athletes (track and field) at the 2011 Pan American Games
Athletes (track and field) at the 2015 Pan American Games